The 2012 African Women's Handball Championship was the 20th edition of the African Women's Handball Championship, organized by the African Handball Confederation. It was the 20th edition of the tournament and was held in Salé, Morocco between 11 and 20 January 2012. The winner qualified for the 2012 Summer Olympics.

Teams

Preliminary round
The draw was held on 24 September 2011 at Casablanca, Morocco.

All times are local (UTC±0).

Group A

Group B

All times are local (UTC±0).

Knockout stage

Bracket

5–8th bracket

All times are local (UTC±0).

Quarterfinals

5–8th semifinals

Semifinals

Ninth place game

Seventh place game

Fifth place game

Bronze medal game

Final

Final standings

Awards

All-Tournament Team

See also
 2012 African Women's Handball Champions League
 2011 African Women's Junior Handball Championship
 2011 African Women's Youth Handball Championship

References

External links
Official website
todor66.com

African Women's Handball Championship
African Women's Handball Championship
2012 African Women's Handball Championship
2012 women
International handball competitions hosted by Morocco
January 2012 sports events in Africa
Women's handball in Morocco
2012 in women's handball
2012 in African women's sport